Homecoming's March is the debut studio release by the Texan black metal band Averse Sefira.  It was released in 1999 on the band's own label, Arrogare, and was produced by the band themselves with co-production by Stuart Lawrence (who would not figure in any of their other albums.

The album is split into band-composed full-length songs and joining those songs are interludes (or "aversions"), as created by "effect artist" Lady of the Evening Faces.

Track Listing
All Music and Lyrics by Averse Sefira. (Copyright Averse Sefira)

"Hymns to the Scourge of Heaven" 8:29
"For We Have Always Been" 7:48
"Sentinel's Plight" 12:47
"Pax Dei" 8:04
"Above the Firmaments of Wrath 6:22
"Ad Infinitum" 6:41
"Homecoming's March" 13:45

Note: The last track, "Homecoming's March" contains a hidden track called "Winter of My Bliss".  Clocking in at a length of 6:10, it pushes the running time of the song to 13:45

Personnel

Averse Sefira
Sanguine Mapsama: Guitars, Vocals
Wrath Satharial Diabolus: Bass, Percussion, Vocals
Lady of the Evening Faces: Effects, Interludes
Velock Gammaliel Maelstrom: Drums

Additional Personnel
Chuck Salvo: Additional Vocals on track 4 ("respectfully dedicated to Immolation)

Production
Arranged by Averse Sefira
Produced & Mixed by Averse Sefira & Stuart Lawrence
Recording Engineer: Stuart Lawrence
Mastered by Averse Sefira & Paul Connolly

References

Averse Sefira albums
1999 debut albums